Nariman (also Romanized as Narīmān) is a tiny village in Zaz-e Gharbi Rural District, Zaz va Mahru District, Aligudarz County, Lorestan Province, Iran. At the 2006 census, its population was 71, in 14 families.

References 

Towns and villages in Aligudarz County